While researchers have found that moderate alcohol consumption in older adults is associated with better cognition and well-being than abstinence, excessive alcohol consumption is associated with widespread and significant brain lesions. Other data – including investigated brain-scans of 36,678 UK Biobank participants – suggest that even "light" or "moderate" consumption of alcohol by itself harms the brain, such as by reducing brain grey matter volume. This may imply that alternatives and generally aiming for lowest possible consumption could usually be the advisable approach.

Despite these physiological effects in principle, in some cases occasional moderate consumption may have ancillary benefits on the brain due to social and psychological benefits if compared to alcohol abstinence and soberness.

While the extent of causation is difficult to prove, alcohol intake – even at levels often considered to be low – "is negatively associated with global brain volume measures, regional gray matter volumes, and white matter microstructure" and these associations become stronger as alcohol intake increases.

The effects can manifest much later—mid-life Alcohol Use Disorder has been found to correlate with increased risk of severe cognitive and memory deficits in later life. Alcohol related brain damage is not only due to the direct toxic effects of alcohol; alcohol withdrawal, nutritional deficiency, electrolyte disturbances, and liver damage are also believed to contribute to alcohol-related brain damage.

Adolescent brain development
Consuming large amounts of alcohol over a period of time can impair normal brain development in humans. Deficits in retrieval of verbal and nonverbal information and in visuospatial functioning were evident in youths with histories of heavy drinking during early and middle adolescence.

During adolescence critical stages of neurodevelopment occur, including remodeling and functional changes in synaptic plasticity and neuronal connectivity in different brain regions. These changes may make adolescents especially susceptible to the harmful effects of alcohol. Compared to adults, adolescents exposed to alcohol are more likely to exhibit cognitive deficits (including learning and memory dysfunction). Some of these cognitive effects, such as learning impairments, may persist into adulthood.

Mechanisms of action

Neuroinflammation
Ethanol can trigger the activation of astroglial cells which can produce a proinflammatory response in the brain. Ethanol interacts with the TLR4 and IL-1RI receptors on these cells to activate intracellular signal transduction pathways. Specifically, ethanol induces the phosphorylation of IL-1R-associated kinase (IRAK), ERK1/2, stress-activated protein kinase (SAPK)/JNK, and p38 mitogen-activated protein kinase (p38 MAPK). Activation of the IRAK/MAPK pathway leads to the stimulation of the transcription factors NF-kappaB and AP-1. These transcription factors cause the upregulation of inducible nitric oxide synthase (iNOS) and cyclooxygenase-2 (COX-2) expression. The upregulation of these inflammatory mediators by ethanol is also associated with an increase in caspase 3 activity and a corresponding increase in cell apoptosis. The exact mechanism by which various concentrations of ethanol either activates or inhibits TLR4/IL-1RI signaling is not currently known, though it may involve alterations in lipid raft clustering  or cell adhesion complexes and actin cytoskeleton organization.

Changes in dopaminergic and glutamatergic signaling pathways
Intermittent ethanol treatment causes a decrease in expression of the dopamine receptor type 2 (D2R) and a decrease in phosphorylation of 2B subunit of the NMDA receptor (NMDAR2B) in the prefrontal cortex, hippocampus, nucleus accumbens, and for only D2R the striatum. It also causes changes in the acetylation of histones H3 and H4 in the prefrontal cortex, nucleus accumbens, and striatum, suggesting chromatin remodeling changes which may mediate long-term alterations. Additionally, adolescent rats pre-exposed to ethanol have higher basal levels of dopamine in the nucleus accumbens, along with a prolonged dopamine response in this area in response to a challenge dose of ethanol. Together, these results suggest that alcohol exposure during adolescence can sensitize the mesolimbic and mesocortical dopamine pathways to cause changes in dopaminergic and glutamatergic signaling, which may affect the remodeling and functions of the adolescent brain. These changes are significant as alcohol’s effect on NMDARs could contribute to learning and memory dysfunction (see Effects of alcohol on memory).

Inhibition of hippocampal neurogenesis
Excessive alcohol intake (binge drinking) causes a decrease in hippocampal neurogenesis, via decreases in neural stem cell proliferation and newborn cell survival. Alcohol decreases the number of cells in S-phase of the cell cycle, and may arrest cells in the G1 phase, thus inhibiting their proliferation. Ethanol has different effects on different types of actively dividing hippocampal progenitors during their initial phases of neuronal development. Chronic alcohol exposure decreases the number of proliferating cells that are radial glia-like, preneuronal, and intermediate types, while not affecting early neuronal type cells; suggesting ethanol treatment alters the precursor cell pool. Furthermore, there is a greater decrease in differentiation and immature neurons than there is in proliferating progenitors, suggesting that the abnormal decrease in the percentage of actively dividing preneuronal progenitors results in a greater reduction in the maturation and survival of postmitotic cells.

Additionally, alcohol exposure increased several markers of cell death. In these studies neural degeneration seems to be mediated by non-apoptotic pathways. One of the proposed mechanisms for alcohol’s neurotoxicity is the production of nitric oxide (NO), yet other studies have found alcohol-induced NO production to lead to apoptosis (see Neuroinflammation section).

Transient versus stable alterations

Many negative physiologic consequences of alcoholism are reversible during abstinence.  As an example, long-term chronic alcoholics suffer a variety of cognitive deficiencies.  However, multiyear abstinence resolves most neurocognitive deficits, except for some lingering deficits in spatial processing.  Nevertheless there are some frequent long-term consequences that are not reversible during abstinence.  Alcohol craving (compulsive need to consume alcohol) is frequently present long-term among alcoholics.  Among 461 individuals who sought help for alcohol problems, followup was provided for up to 16 years.  By 16 years, 54% of those who tried to remain abstinent without professional help had relapsed, and 39% of those who tried to remain abstinent with help had relapsed.

Alcohol consumption can substantially impair neurobiologically-beneficial and -demanding exercise.

Long-term, stable consequences of chronic hazardous alcohol use are thought to be due to stable alterations of gene expression resulting from epigenetic changes within particular regions of the brain.  For example, in rats exposed to alcohol for up to 5 days, there was an increase in histone 3 lysine 9 acetylation in the pronociceptin promoter in the brain amygdala complex.  This acetylation is an activating mark for pronociceptin.  The nociceptin/nociceptin opioid receptor system is involved in the reinforcing or conditioning effects of alcohol.

References

Alcohol and health
Brain, long